Adopaeoides is a genus of butterflies in the grass skipper subfamily Hesperiinae. It is found in Mexico and the south-western United States.

Species include:
Adopaeoides bistriata Godman, 1900 (Mexico)
Adopaeoides prittwitzi (Plötz, 1884) – sunrise skipper (Mexico, south-western USA)

External links
Adopaeoides. Natural History Museum Lepidoptera Database.
Images. Butterflies of the Americas.

Hesperiinae
Hesperiidae of South America
Hesperiidae genera
Taxa named by Frederick DuCane Godman